Prestonkirk Parish Church is a Church of Scotland parish church at East Linton, in the parish of Traprain, East Lothian, Scotland, UK, close to Preston Mill, Smeaton, Phantassie, and the River Tyne.

Building
The original church is said to have been founded by Saint Baldred of Tyninghame, also known as St Baldred of the Bass, in the 6th century. The tower of the present church dates from 1631, and the main building from 1770. It was enlarged in 1824 and the interior was redesigned in 1892. The St Baldred window was installed in 1959.

Churchyard
Amongst the persons buried in Prestonkirk churchyard are:
Andrew Meikle, the inventor of the threshing machine
George Rennie, agriculturalist and brother of John Rennie, civil engineer

Photo gallery

Sources
The monumental inscriptions at Prestonkirk were published by the Scottish Genealogy Society in 2000.
Local History Society, "By the Linn Rocks", 1999
Description of building by Chris Tabraham, Principal Inspector of Ancient Monuments with Historic Scotland

References

External links
Webpages of Prestonkirk
RCAHMS - Watch tower at Prestonkirk

Church of Scotland churches in Scotland
Churches in East Lothian
Category A listed buildings in East Lothian
Listed churches in Scotland
East Linton